Aonach Shasuinn (888 m) is a mountain in the Northwest Highlands of Scotland. It lies in Inverness-shire, on the southern side of Glen Affric.

Taking the form of a steep-sided ridge, the peak can either be climbed from Glen Affric or Glen Moriston in the south. The nearest village is Cannich.

References

Marilyns of Scotland
Corbetts
Mountains and hills of the Northwest Highlands